Brockford and Wetheringsett railway station was a station on the Mid-Suffolk Light Railway.

History
Brockford and Wetheringsett railway station served the villages of Wetheringsett and Brockford Green in Suffolk. It was on the Mid-Suffolk Light Railway. The station was opened in 1908 and closed in 1952. The station was located six miles from Haughley and was made up of two small corrugated iron clad huts, one acting as booking office, staff room and store room and the other as passenger waiting room.

After the railway closed the station site was turned into an industrial site. When the Mid-Suffolk Light Railway Society began building up their collection, the site of the station's cattle dock was found and the original brickwork makes up part of a new platform at the station.

References 

Comfort, N. A. (1986) The Mid-Suffolk Light Railway, The Oakwood Press. 
Paye, P. (1986) The Mid-Suffolk Light Railway, Wild Swan Publications Ltd. 

Disused railway stations in Suffolk
Former Mid-Suffolk Light Railway stations
Railway stations in Great Britain opened in 1908
Railway stations in Great Britain closed in 1952
1908 establishments in England